Playlist: The Very Best of Ted Nugent is a 2009 compilation album by American hard rock musician Ted Nugent. It is one of the titles in the Playlist album series.

AllMusic reviewer James Christopher Monger praised the album, remarking that it included some of Nugent's "strip club classics".

Track listing 
All songs by Ted Nugent, except where indicated.

 "Great White Buffalo" (live) – 6:25
 "Cat Scratch Fever" – 3:40
 "Wango Tango" – 4:50
 "Stranglehold" – 8:24
 "Wang Dang Sweet Poontang" – 3:16
 "Free-For-All" – 3:23
 "Dog Eat Dog" – 4:05
 "Scream Dream" – 3:20
 "Weekend Warriors" – 3:09
 "Baby, Please Don't Go" (live) (Big Joe Williams) – 6:00
 "Snakeskin Cowboys" – 4:35
 "Live It Up" (Nugent, Derek St. Holmes) – 4:00
 "Smokescreen" – 4:15
 "Out of Control" – 3:29

 Rob Grange appears on tracks 1, 2, 3, 4, 5, 6, 10, 11, 12 and 14

References

See also 

2009 in music
Great Gonzos!
Playlist compilation albums

2009 compilation albums
Ted Nugent albums
Nugent, Ted